William Farnworth Handley (9 October 1780 – 4 December 1851) was a British Member of Parliament.

He was the eldest son of William Handley of Newark.

He was appointed High Sheriff of Nottinghamshire for 1822–23 and elected MP for Newark in 1831, sitting until 1835.

He died unmarried in 1851.

References

 

1780 births
1851 deaths
People from Newark-on-Trent
High Sheriffs of Nottinghamshire
Members of the Parliament of the United Kingdom for English constituencies
UK MPs 1830–1831
UK MPs 1831–1832
UK MPs 1832–1835